Chris Romero may refer to:

Chris Youngblood, an American wrestler born Christopher Romero
Christine Forrest, an American actress sometimes credited as Chris Romero